The Social Liberal and Democratic Party is a liberal party in Mozambique.

See also
Liberalism
Social liberalism
Contributions to liberal theory
Liberalism worldwide
List of liberal parties
Liberal democracy

Political parties in Mozambique
Social liberal parties